Óscar E. Duplan Maldonado (April 17, 1890 - April 23, 1942) was the Mexican ambassador to Colombia from 1933 to 1934.

Biography
He was born on April 17, 1890, in Pichucalco, Mexico to Dr. Ernesto Duplán.  He attended the Model School of Orizaba and Universidad Veracruzana and Universidad Popular Autónoma del Estado de Puebla but did not graduate.  He joined the diplomatic service as a secretary at the Embassy of Mexico, Washington, D.C. under Eliseo Arredondo.

He served as Ambassador of Mexico to Colombia from 1933 to 1934

He died on April 23, 1942 in Ciudad de México.

References

1890 births
1942 deaths
Ambassadors of Mexico to Colombia
People from Pichucalco